Magic is the seventh studio album by American rock band Smash Mouth, released on September 4, 2012 through 429 Records. It is their first album in six years since the release of Summer Girl in 2006. It is also the first album without original guitarist and primary songwriter Greg Camp since his departure from the band and the last album to feature lead vocalist Steve Harwell before his retirement in 2021.

The first single on the album, "Magic", peaked at No. 22 on the Billboard Adult Contemporary chart.

Reception
AllMusic gave the album 3½ stars, saying it was "as effortlessly effervescent as anything else Smash Mouth has ever released, filled with grooving, organ-fueled beach party anthems".

Track listing

Personnel
Steve Harwell – lead vocals
Mike Krompass – guitars, backing vocals
Paul De Lisle – bass, backing vocals
Randy Cooke – drums, percussion, drum programming
Michael Klooster – keyboards, programming, backing vocals

Additional vocalists
J. Dash – vocals on "Magic" and "Flippin' Out" 
Stephen Vickers – backing vocals 
Andrew Fromm – backing vocals 
Jennifer Paige – backing vocals 
Shawn Mayer – backing vocals 
Storm Gardiner – backing vocals

Additional musicians
Juan Portela – keyboards 
Greg Camp – guitars, background vocals on "Don't You (Forget About Me)"
Michael Urbano – drums on "Don't You (Forget About Me)"

Production
 All tracks produced by Mike Komprass

References

External links

Magic at YouTube (streamed copy where licensed)

2012 albums
429 Records albums
Smash Mouth albums